John Harcourt Berry (1849- 1923) was a Church of England priest and  Royal Navy chaplain. He was the Chaplain of the Fleet, serving from 1899 to 1901.

Berry was educated at Christ Church, Oxford. He was ordained deacon in 1874 and priest in 1875 and began his ecclesiastical career with a curacy at Preston-on-Stour. He served with the Navy from 1876 to 1901

Footnotes

1849 births
1923 deaths
19th-century Irish Anglican priests
Chaplains of the Fleet
Alumni of Christ Church, Oxford
20th-century English Anglican priests